Masauso Zimba (born 11 June 1992) is a Zambian football defender who currently plays for Forest Rangers F.C.

References

1992 births
Living people
Zambian footballers
Zambia international footballers
Roan United F.C. players
Red Arrows F.C. players
Konkola Mine Police F.C. players
Nkana F.C. players
Konkola Blades F.C. players
Forest Rangers F.C. players
Association football defenders